Wat Ket Karam or Wat Sa Ket is a Buddhist temple in Chiang Mai, Thailand

History
Wat Ket Karam was built in 1428 during the Phra Jao Sam Fang Kaen era. Around the temple there is the Ket Kaew Chura Manee pagoda which is worshipped by the community and an old market of the Chinese community. Located along the Ping River, in this temple there is a museum that exhibits antiques and old photos that are hard to find which tell the story of the Chiang Mai city as well.

Geography
Wat Ket Karam is located at 96, Ban Wat Ket, Charoen Rat Road, Amphoe Mueang, Chiang Mai Province. It has a total area of 6 rai 1 ngan 51 square wah. As about 10000 m2

Transportation
You may reach Wat Ket Karam by car van bus or plane and go to Chiang Mai Arcade Bus Terminal. From this place, you can travel by minibus to Wat Ket Karam which costs 15 baht.

References

http://www.comingthailand.com/chiangmai/wat-katekaram.html

Buildings and structures in Chiang Mai
Ket Karam